Critical line may refer to:

In mathematics, a specific subset of the complex numbers asserted by the Riemann hypothesis to be the locus of all non-trivial zeroes of the Riemann zeta function
Critical line theorem, a mathematical theorem saying that the proportion of nontrivial zeros of the Riemann zeta function lying on the critical line is greater than zero
Critical line (thermodynamics), a higher-dimensional equivalent of a critical point
Critical Line, an art exhibition
Critical line method, a procedure in Portfolio optimization